The ninth season of Bulgarian singing reality competition The Voice of Bulgaria premiered on 4 September 2022. The show is broadcast by bTV on Sundays, starting at 8 pm. The four coaches from previous season, Ivan Lechev, Galena, Lubo Kirov and Dara returned for another season.

Jacklyn Tarracki was crowned The Voice of Bulgaria, marking Dara’s first win as a coach.

Coaches and hosts 

The coaching panel remains unchanged from previous season: Ivan Lechev, Galena, Lubo Kirov and Dara. Ivan Tishev remains as the presenter and is joined by Preyah as V-Reporter online, replacing Alexandra Bogdanska.

Teams 

  Winner
  Runner-up
  Third place
  Fourth place
  Fifth place
  Sixth place
  Eliminated in the Live Semi-final
  Eliminated in the Cross Battles
  Stolen in the Battles
  Artist was stolen but was later switched with another artist and eliminated
  Eliminated in the Battles
  Eliminated in the Final selection

Blind auditions 
Continuing the rule from the previous season, coaches could have an unlimited number of contestants on their team and finalize them at the end of the auditions. However, unlike the last season, coaches have to cut their team down to 12 participants, instead of 14, to remain on their team. Each coach was given two blocks to use during the blinds, but Dara and Galena didn't use their second block.

Episode 1 (4 September)

Episode 2 (11 September)

Episode 3 (18 September)

Episode 4 (25 September)

Episode 5 (1 October)

Episode 6 (9 October)

Episode 7 (16 October)

Battles 
The battles begin airing on October 23. The battle advisors for each coach this season were the following: Alexandrina Pendatchanska for Team Ivan, Mihaela Marinova for Team Dara, third season coach Desi Slava for Team Galena, and Nina Nikolina for Team Lubo. 

New to this season is the implementation of "unlimited steals". Each artist that is stolen will sit in a designated seat in the "Steal room" as they watch the other performances. If a coach steals one artist but later decides to steal another, the previous artist will be replaced and eliminated. After the battle rounds, the artist who ends-up seating on the chair will move to the next round.

Cross Battles 
The Cross Battles began airing on 13 November and ended on 20 November. In this round, each coach was left with seven contestants. For the first time, the singers did not know their competitor until the moment of rehearsals. Only fourteen contestants, regardless of team, were let through the Semi-final.

Episode 11 (13 November)

Episode 12 (20 November)

Live shows

Semi-final
The semi-final aired on 27 November. In this round, fourteen artists were left in the competition. However, this season the public could choose a fifteenth semi-finalist, who had previously been eliminated. The public voted for Maxim Panayotov from Team Galena to take this spot.
Six artists, from any team, were voted through to the finale. Unlike the previous season, every coach is represented in the finale.

Final
The Final took place on 4 December. Out of the remaining six artists, the public voted for the winner. Six pop stars supported the finalists - Poli Genova, Mihaela Fileva, Margarita Hranova, Medi, Jeremy? and Kristian Kostov.

Jacklyn Tarrakci was announced as the winner, which marked Dara's first victory as a coach.

References 

Bulgaria
2022 Bulgarian television seasons
Bulgarian television series